Czerników  is a village in the administrative district of Gmina Piątek, within Łęczyca County, Łódź Voivodeship, in central Poland. As of the census of 2011, the village has population of 147.

References

Villages in Łęczyca County